Test and learn is a set of practices followed by retailers, banks and other consumer-focused companies to test ideas in a small number of locations or customers to predict impact. The process is often designed to answer three questions about any tested program before rollout: 

 What impact will the program have on key performance indicators if executed across the network or customer base? 
 Will the program have a larger impact on some stores/customers than others? 
 Which components of the idea are actually working?

Historical context 

Test and learn has been systematically applied as far back as 1988 by Capital One. Capital One has been aggressive about testing since the firm was founded, testing everything from product design to marketing to customer selection to collection policies. In a single year, the company performs tens of thousands of tests, allowing it to offer thousands of different types of credit cards to customers, based on the knowledge gained from their tests. Richard Fairbank, CEO of Capital One, called test and learn "a marketing revolution that can be applied to many businesses".

Examples 

 Retail banks running different commercials in different markets.
 Fast food restaurants launching a new menu item or product for a limited time in select locations 
 Big-box retailers evaluating “store of the future” programs
 Companies evaluating pricing strategies
 Retailers testing merchandising layouts across their door base
 The UK government, through research projects such as the College for Teaching and Learning's Close the Gap: Test and learn

Test and learn in practice 

 Woolworths uses a test-and-learn approach to identify which stores should undergo renovations. 
 Wawa Food Markets, a Mid-Atlantic convenience store chain, uses Test and Learn across several aspects of its business:
 Measuring the effect of introducing a new product
 Determining the impact of adding additional staff
 Understanding how the opening a new location would impact existing nearby locations
 Subway ran a promotion that lowered the price of its foot-long sandwiches to $5. Before deciding to launch the promotion nationally, Subway ran a test that compared locations offering the $5 foot-long sandwiches to a group of similar control restaurants that were not offering the promotion.
 Kraft Foods, a manufacturer and distributor of packaged foods, uses testing to optimize the placement of its products on grocery store shelves:
 Determining the effect of a coffee aisle re-design on sales of premium coffees
 Measuring the impact on product sales of a change to in-store sales representatives' responsibilities
 Pier 1 Imports, a recently bankrupt retail chain specializing in home decor and furnishings, uses testing to measure the effectiveness of search advertising campaigns.
 Test and learn is also methodically used online to test impact of various web page layouts on user behavior. Tools such as Google Website Analyzer provide every site with the ability to test various elements and their effect on user engagement.

Test and learn software
There are a variety of software tools available today to support systematic testing within an organization. However, there is currently no one software package that covers all types of tests, and in some cases significant knowledge of statistics is still required for effective analysis.

Many companies, including Capital One and eBay, have developed experiment management software within the company. Alternatives to internal solutions include broad statistical analysis software tools such as SAS or test and learn focused software from Applied Predictive Technologies, Trial Run and MarketDial. There are also a variety of more narrowly tailored products, focused on particular problems or fields. In web analytics, for example, firms such as Omniture, WebTrends, and Google have created specialized software.

Criticism 

Companies wanting to conduct Test and Learn must mobilize, track and analyze site and customer data at very granular levels. This can often be a massive and expensive undertaking. Increasingly however, an exponential increase in computing power, and corresponding decrease in its cost, have made testing more accessible. In the Harvard Business Review February 2009 article "How to Design Smart Business Experiments", Thomas Davenport discusses the Test and Learn Process, and describes how several companies have overcome these and other barriers to testing.

See also 
 Clinical trials
 Scientific method
 Design of experiments
 Evidence-based management
 Evidence-based practices
 Business process reengineering
 A/B testing

References

Business terms
Quality
Tests